Verbesina helianthoides, commonly called yellow crownbeard or gravelweed,
is a species of flowering plant in the family Asteraceae. It is native to the United States, where it is primarily found in the Upper South and South Central areas. Its natural habitat is in communities that receive ample sunlight, such as open woodlands, prairies, and glades.

It has hairy, winged stems and alternate leaves that are coarsely hairy on the upper surface. It produces yellow flowers from May to October. Its flowering time starts much earlier in the year than other Verbesina that it co-occurs with, such as Verbesina alternifolia with yellow flowers and Verbesina virginica with white flowers. It also is shorter in height.

References

helianthoides